Webb Névé is the névé at the head of Seafarer Glacier in Victoria Land. It was named by the Northern Party of the New Zealand Geological Survey Antarctic Expedition, 1966–67, after the appointed Public Relations Officer Dexter Webb, who was killed before taking up the appointment.

References

Snow fields of Victoria Land
Pennell Coast
Névés of Antarctica